The Rebel Bear is a Glasgow street muralist of unknown identity sometimes referred to as "The Scottish Banksy". The artist cloaks their identity while publicly creating work via the donning of a bear costume  . The Rebel Bear is perhaps best known for their Glasgow street painting Fear and Love, of a male-female couple both dropping their  protective masks a bit from covering their noses and mouths, to engage in a kiss.

Among their other works in Glasgow is a mural placed in an underpass making light of the mesmerizing power of Mark Zuckerberg and Facebook and a free Palestine/ free Wi-Fi' mural located at the top on Gibson Street, near the Glasgow University Library.  

The Bear has gained worldwide attention for COVID-19 pandemic related art encouraging the wearing of protective masks (the celebrated aforementioned Fear and Love of a male-female couple both having lowered their protective masks to engage in a kiss) and thanking Frontline Healthcare workers (a nurse forming a heart with her hands on Ashton Lane in Glasgow).

The Rebel Bear also created a mural in the New York City borough of Brooklyn during a visit there called Rotten Apple.

Works by The Rebel Bear have also appeared in Calais, France and London, England.

References

Scottish painters
Living people
Year of birth missing (living people)
Scottish muralists